Walter Dubree was an American architect from La Junta, Colorado.  He designed several works which are listed on the National Register of Historic Places (NRHP).

Works include:
Dr. Frank Finney House (1899), 608 Belleview Ave., La Junta, CO, NRHP-listed
a high school in or near Rocky Ford (c.1908)
Carnegie Public Library (1908), 1005 Sycamore Ave., Rocky Ford, CO, NRHP-listed
Bent County High School (1913 or 1914), 1214 Ambassador Thompson Blvd., (with James Larson) Las Animas, CO, NRHP-listed 
North La Junta School (1914), at junction of CO 109 and CO 194, North La Junta, Colorado, NRHP-listed

References

Architects from Colorado
20th-century American architects
Year of birth missing
Year of death missing